Michael Whelan, "the Poet of Renous", was born in 1858 in Renous, New Brunswick. He worked as a school teacher, and as a book-keeper for a local mill. He is, however, best known for his poetry celebrating the Miramichi, including the famous Dungarvon Whooper. He died at Chatham, New Brunswick (now Miramichi, New Brunswick) in 1937.

References

1858 births
1937 deaths
19th-century Canadian poets
Canadian male poets
Writers from New Brunswick
People from Miramichi, New Brunswick
19th-century Canadian male writers